Archery at the 2011 Canada Winter Games was at Sackville High School in Halifax, NS.  It was held from the 22 to 25 February.  There were 6 events of archery.

Medal table
The following is the medal table for alpine skiing at the 2011 Canada Winter Games.

Men's events

Women's events

Mixed events

References

External links 
The Results

2011 Canada Winter Games